Horse harness is a device that connects a horse to a vehicle or another type of load.

There are two main categories of horse harness: (1) the "breaststrap" or "breastcollar" design, and (2) the collar and hames design.   For light work, such as horse show competition where light carts are used, a harness needs only a breastcollar.  It can only be used for lighter hauling, since it places the weight of the load on the sternum of the horse and the nearby windpipe.  This is not the heaviest skeletal area; also heavy loads can constrict the windpipe and reduce a horse's air supply.

By contrast, the collar and harness places the weight of the load onto the horse's shoulders, and without any restriction on the air supply. For heavy hauling, the harness must include a horse collar to allow the animal to use its full weight and strength.

Harness components designed for other animals (such as the yoke used with oxen) are not suitable for horses and will not allow the horse to work efficiently.

Putting harness on a horse is called harnessing or harnessing up.  Attaching the harness to the load is called putting to (British Isles) or hitching (North America).  The order of putting on harness components varies by discipline, but when a horse collar is used, it is usually put on first.

History
Throughout the ancient world, the 'throat-and-girth' harness was used for harnessing horses that pulled carts; this greatly limited a horse's ability to exert itself as it was constantly choked at the neck. A painting on a lacquerware box from the State of Chu, dated to the 4th century BC, shows the first known use of a yoke placed across a horses's chest, with traces connecting to the chariot shaft. The hard yoke across the horse's chest was gradually replaced by a breast strap, which was often depicted in carved reliefs and stamped bricks of tombs from the Han Dynasty (202 BC – 220 AD). Eventually, the horse collar was invented in China, at least by the 5th century.

Parts

Parts of the harness include:
A collar to allow the horse to push against the harness with its shoulders and chest.  Two main alternative arrangements (with some intermediate types):
A horse collar (or full collar).  A padded loop fitting closely around the horse's neck, pointed at the top to fit the crest of the neck.  Used for heavier pulling, especially when used without a swingletree or whippletree.
A breastcollar.  A padded strap running around the chest from side to side.  Used for light work, or for somewhat heavier work it is used together with a swingletree evenly on each step without rubbing.
Hames (if a full collar is used).  Two metal or wooden strips which take the full force of the pull, padded by the collar.
Breeching .  A strap around the horse's haunches allowing it to set back and slow a vehicle, usually hooked to the shafts or pole of the vehicle (also known as thill).  Used for a single horse, a pair, or in a larger team, only for the wheelers (the animal or pair closest to the vehicle).  The leaders in a team do not have breeching, as they are in front of the shafts or pole and so cannot slow the vehicle.  Breeching may also be omitted in fine harness, or when the cart is very light or has efficient brakes on the wheels.
Traces.  The straps or chains which take the pull from the breastcollar or hames to the load.
Harness saddle or "pad".  A small supportive piece of the harness that lies on the horse's back, not the same as a riding saddle.
Girth.  A strap that goes firmly around the girth of the horse to attach the harness saddle.
 Belly-band. A strap that goes more loosely under the belly of the horse, outside the girth.  Prevents the shafts rising up, especially on a two-wheeled vehicle (where weight on the rear of the cart may tip the front up).
 Back band.  A strap going through the harness saddle to join the belly band either side.  Takes the weight of the shafts or pole.  In cart harness it is replaced by a chain running in a groove in the harness saddle, hooked to the shafts either side.
 Sliding back band.  In a two-wheeled vehicle, the shafts are fixed to the vehicle to hold it level.  On a side-slope, one shaft will be higher than the other, and in this case the back band is normally allowed to slide sideways through the harness saddle, so the horse can walk upright without strain on the harness.
 Fixed back-band.  In a four-wheeled vehicle, the shafts or pole must be allowed to hinge up and down, to allow the horse and vehicle to pass over hillocks and dips.  Often the shafts are independently hinged, and on a side-slope these will each hinge to follow the horse, and a sliding back band is not needed.  However, if a sliding back band was used with independent shafts it might allow one shaft to ride up higher than the other, and so for such shafts the back-band is normally fixed to the harness saddle.  On other four-wheeled vehicles, the two shafts hinge together, and a sliding back band is needed as for two-wheeled vehicles.
 Surcingle. A term used within certain light fine harness designs to describe the combination of a light girth and harness saddle.
False martingale.  A strap passing between the front legs, from the centre of the collar to the belly band, to hold the collar in position.  Called "false", because unlike a true martingale it does not attach to the bridle or have any influence on the horse's action.
Crupper.  A soft padded loop under the base of the tail, to keep the harness from slipping forward.
Back strap. A strap attached by looping through the crupper D at the rear of the saddle / pad or surcingle to attach the crupper
Shaft tugs, or just tugs.  Loops attached to the back band to hold up the shafts of a vehicle in van or fine harness (not needed in cart harness, which attaches to hooks on the shafts).  Two types:
For two-wheeled vehicles the tugs are stiff leather loops, fitting fairly loosely around the shafts (which are rigidly attached to the vehicle), to allow flexibility as the animal and the vehicle move against each other.
For four-wheeled vehicles with independently hinged shafts, the tugs (Tilbury tugs) are leather straps buckled tightly around the shafts so they move with the animal.
Terrets.  Metal loops on the saddle and collar to support the reins.  The bridles of the rear animals of a large team may also have terrets to take the lines of the animals to the front of them.
Reins or Lines.  Long leather straps (occasionally ropes) running from the bit to the driver's hands, used to guide the horses.  In teams of several animals these may be joined together so the driver need hold only one pair.

Bridle:  When working in harness, most horses wear a specialised bridle that includes features not seen in bridles used for riding.  These usually include blinders, also called blinkers or winkers, behind and to the side of the horse's eyes, to prevent it from being distracted by the cart and other activity behind it.  Harness racing horses sometimes have a shadow roll on the noseband of the bridle for the same purpose.
Bits for harness (often a Liverpool bit, but the Wilson snaffle is also popular) may be similar to those used for riding, particularly in mouthpiece, usually operating with a curb bit and adjustable leverage to help balance the effect of the reins on different horses in a team. The bridles of the rearward horses in a team (the wheelers in a four-horse team, and both wheelers and centre horses in a six-horse team) often have rings at each end of the browband, through which the lines of the forward horses pass.
Some horses pulling lighter vehicles, particularly at horse shows and other public exhibitions, may have an overcheck to assist them in holding a desired head position, and for safety reasons (to avoid the horse's head and neck going under the shaft in a stumble).  In some cases a specially designed running martingale may also be added.  A looser overcheck may also be used in a working harness to prevent the horse grazing.  The overcheck hooks to a pedestal on the harness saddle.
Horse brasses.  Brass plaques mounted on leather straps, used for decoration, especially on working harness.  Made in a very wide range of designs.

Types

Show harness
Show harnesses for light cart driving have a breastcollar instead of a horse collar and are made with strong but refined-looking leather throughout, usually black and highly polished.  In draft horse showing and combined driving, horse collars are seen, but harness leather is still highly polished and well-finished.

Carriage or van harness

Lighter weight but strong harness similar to show harness, used for pulling passenger vehicles such as buggies or carts, or other lighter loads.  The  traces attach either to the shafts of the vehicle or to the vehicle itself, and the harness may have either a horse collar or a breastcollar.

Racing harness

The racing harness, like the show harness, is a breastcollar harness.  Horses are hitched to a very lightweight two-wheeled cart, called a sulky.  Most race harnesses incorporate a standing martingale and an overcheck. Horses may be raced in a "blind" bridle, which restricts the horse from seeing beside and behind him to various degrees by use of blinkers (horse tack), or may be raced with an "open" bridle, one that does not have blinkers.  Specialized equipment, called "hobbles" or "hopples" are added to the harness of race horses who  pace (and sometimes to the harness of those who trot) in order to help them maintain their gait.

Cart or wagon harness
Harness for pulling heavier vehicles always has a horse collar.  The traces are often made of chain and attach to loops on the shafts of the vehicle.  A chain attached to the shafts may be passed over the saddle to carry their weight.  Reins are of rope or leather, depending on region of the world.

Plow harness

Similar to cart harness but without breeching, used for dragged loads such as plows, harrows, canal boats or logs. This style is also used on the leaders in a team of animals pulling a vehicle.  The traces attach to a whippletree behind the horse and this then pulls the load (or in larger teams may attach to further whippletrees).

There are two main plow harness types: the New England D-Ring and the Western harness.  The New England D-Ring makes use of a metal D shaped ring that allows for a ninety degree angle to be maintained at the junction of the front trace and the hames regardless of the height of the implement being pulled.  The Western harness does not provide this flexibility but has other useful characteristics such as a strap that runs from the britchen to the collar which stops the pull from riding up and hitting the horses in the face when descending a steep incline.

See also

Combined driving
Dog harness
Draft horse showing
Driving (horse)
Harness racing
Horse brass
Horse collar
Horse tack
Horse-drawn vehicle
Santa Claus's reindeer
Shaft bow

References

 
Chinese inventions